Gregor Collins (born August 22, 1976) is an American author, speaker, actor and former reality television producer, best known for playing Matt in the mumblecore film Goodbye Promise, and for writing the memoir The Accidental Caregiver: How I Met, Loved and Lost Legendary Holocaust Refugee Maria Altmann, as well as its sequel, The Accidental Caregiver Part II: Saying Yes to a World without Maria Altmann.

Early life
Collins spent his childhood and adolescent years in the Washington, D.C. area and attended Centreville High School in Northern Virginia, where he was the top-seeded player on his school golf team. Collins subsequently received a golf grant to Ohio Wesleyan University, played for a semester, then transferred to Miami University for two more semesters before taking a year off to work as a production assistant for the television series World Business Review with Caspar Weinberger. He completed his undergraduate studies at Florida State University, where he majored in Media Production.

Career
Collins moved to Los Angeles in 2000 to pursue a career in entertainment. He worked his way into producing various reality television shows such as Blind Date, Celebrity Mole: Yucatán, and E!. In 2004 he began to pursue professional acting, eventually performing on stage, in television and in independent films, landing lead roles in the indie feature Night Before the Wedding and the improvised feature Goodbye Promise.

In October 2014 Collins moved to the Murray Hill, Manhattan section of New York, living with and serving as a caregiver to Austrian painter Ruth Rogers-Altmann while he prepared a stage production of his book The Accidental Caregiver, about his experience caring for Rogers-Altmann's cousin Maria Altmann.

Collins has written essays for The Guardian, Focus (German magazine), Life Matters Media, Theater That Matters, Film Courage, Filmmaking Stuff, and has been a regular contributor to CINEMAEDITOR since 2013.

The Accidental Caregiver
In 2012 Collins published the memoir The Accidental Caregiver: How I Met, Loved and Lost Legendary Holocaust Refugee Maria Altmann, detailing his chance meeting and unusual bond with Gustav Klimt heiress Maria Altmann, culminating in her death in early 2011.

In 2015 a Polish translation of the book was published.

Collins gives keynote speeches around the world sharing his experience as Altmann's caregiver, often working with the Women's International Zionist Organization.

Stage plays
The Accidental Caregiver stageplay world premiered at the Robert Moss Theater in New York City on January 26, 2015, and was directed by British theatre director Alice Kornitzer.
The play also had a staged reading at the Austrian Cultural Forum New York on June 25, 2015, which was directed by Collins. Actors Christian Scheider and Rochelle Slovin read the parts of Gregor and Maria, respectively.

In November 2015 Collins wrote the Oscar Wilde-inspired dark comedy Pentonville for the Manhattan Repertory Theatre in New York, which was directed by Jonathan Stuart Cerullo. In June 2016 Collins created, co-wrote and co-produced the black comedy series Stories for the People's Improv Theater in New York.

In January 2017 Collins' play The Secret World Inside Me was developed and performed as a staged reading at the IATI Theater in New York.

Filmography

References

External links

 
 Official website
 Interview with Gregor Collins about Maria Altmann, Austria and Nazi Art Theft on Media Mayhem with host Allison Hope Weiner.

1976 births
Living people
Male actors from Washington, D.C.
Writers from Washington, D.C.
Ohio Wesleyan University alumni
Florida State University alumni
People from Murray Hill, Manhattan